Semilaoma laevis, also known as the smooth pinhead snail, is a tiny species of land snail that is endemic to Australia's Lord Howe Island in the Tasman Sea.

Description
The depressedly turbinate shell of the mature snail is 0.7–0.8 mm in height, with a diameter of 1.2–1.3 mm, and a low spire. It is pale yellow to white in colour. The whorls are rounded. The sutures are impressed, with closely-spaced radial ribs. It has a roundly lunate aperture, and a narrowly open umbilicus. The animal is unknown.

Distribution and habitat
The snail is common and widespread across the island, living in lowland forest, rainforest and scrub.

References

 
 

 
laevis
Gastropods of Lord Howe Island
Gastropods described in 2010